This article shows past squads from the Puerto Rican women's professional volleyball team Criollas de Caguas from the Liga de Voleibol Superior Femenino.

2009
 Position:
As of February 2009
 Head coach:  Claudio López Pinheiro
 Assistant coach:  Rubén Cruz

Release or Transfer

 Head coach:  Luis García

References

External links
 Criollas Official Site
 Official Blog

Puerto Rican women's volleyball club squads